Chandel is a surname. Notable people with the surname include:

Narayan Chandel (born 1965), Indian politician
Suresh Chandel (born 1960), Indian politician
Ashok Kumar Singh Chandel, Indian politician
Pushpendra Singh Chandel, Indian politician
Raj Bahadur Singh Chandel, Indian politician